Garnet is a census-designated place in Riverside County, California. The 2010 United States census reported Garnet's population was 7,543.

History
In 1875 Garnet was a railroad station for the Southern Pacific Railroad. Since then it has had various names: Palms (original name), Seven Palms (1889), Palm Springs (1900), Pierce (1906), Gray (1917), Noria (1918), and finally Garnet (1923).

Geography
According to the United States Census Bureau, the CDP covers an area of 11.4 square miles (29.6 km), 98.82% of it land and 1.18% of it water.

Demographics

At the 2010 census Garnet had a population of 7,543. The racial makeup of Garnet was 4,247 (56.3%) White, 203 (2.7%) African American, 96 (1.3%) Native American, 62 (0.8%) Asian, 10 (0.1%) Pacific Islander, 2,636 (34.9%) from other races, and 289 (3.8%) from two or more races. Hispanic or Latino of any race were 5,580 persons (74.0%).

The census reported that 7,538 people (99.9% of the population) lived in households, no one lived in non-institutionalized group quarters and 5 (0.1%) were institutionalized.

There were 2,174 households, 1,099 (50.6%) had children under the age of 18 living in them, 1,125 (51.7%) were opposite-sex married couples living together, 314 (14.4%) had a female householder with no husband present, 180 (8.3%) had a male householder with no wife present.  There were 184 (8.5%) unmarried opposite-sex partnerships, and 35 (1.6%) same-sex married couples or partnerships. 398 households (18.3%) were one person and 165 (7.6%) had someone living alone who was 65 or older. The average household size was 3.47.  There were 1,619 families (74.5% of households); the average family size was 4.00.

The age distribution was 2,527 people (33.5%) under the age of 18, 808 people (10.7%) aged 18 to 24, 2,085 people (27.6%) aged 25 to 44, 1,450 people (19.2%) aged 45 to 64, and 673 people (8.9%) who were 65 or older.  The median age was 29.3 years. For every 100 females, there were 103.2 males.  For every 100 females age 18 and over, there were 102.1 males.

There were 2,670 housing units at an average density of 233.7 per square mile, of the occupied units 1,515 (69.7%) were owner-occupied and 659 (30.3%) were rented. The homeowner vacancy rate was 5.0%; the rental vacancy rate was 10.3%.  4,932 people (65.4% of the population) lived in owner-occupied housing units and 2,606 people (34.5%) lived in rental housing units.

References

Census-designated places in Riverside County, California
Census-designated places in California